Annette in Paradise is a 1934 German-Czech musical film directed by Max Obal and starring Ursula Grabley, Hans Söhnker and Ida Wüst. A separate Czech language version was also released.

The film's sets were designed by Stepán Kopecký.

Cast
 Ursula Grabley as Annette
 Hans Söhnker as Hans Siebert
 Ida Wüst as Tante Olga
 Max Gülstorff as Direktor Bertusch
 Oscar Sabo as Papa Stelzke
 Jessie Vihrog as Trude
 Hans Joachim Schaufuß as Maxe
 Singing Babies as Singers

References

Bibliography

External links 
 

1934 musical films
German musical films
1934 films
Czech musical films
Films of Nazi Germany
1930s German-language films
Films directed by Max Obal
German multilingual films
German black-and-white films
Czechoslovak musical films
Czechoslovak black-and-white films
Czechoslovak multilingual films
1934 multilingual films
1930s German films